Borunbabur Bondhu is a 2019 Indian Bengali language film directed by Anik Dutta for Surinder Films. The film based on a Bengali story Chhad written by Ramapada Chowdhury is the story of an old man,  whose life faces upheaval after people come to know that a VVIP who was once his friend, is coming for a visit. The film stars Soumitra Chatterjee in the role of elderly man with supporting cast of Madhabi Mukhopadhyay, Paran Bandopadhyay, Ritwick Chakraborty, Arpita Chatterjee, Sreelekha Mitra, Kaushik Sen and Bidipta Chakraborty.

The film was screened at the 25th Kolkata International Film Festival in 2019, the Third Eye Asian Film Festival, Mumbai in March 2020, and the Indian Film Festival of Cincinnati, Ohio on 21 October 2020.

Cast 
 Soumitra Chatterjee
 Madhabi Mukherjee
 Kaushik Sen
 Sreelekha Mitra
 Debolina Dutta
 Arpita Chatterjee

Release 
The film premiered at the 25th Kolkata International Film Festival in 2019, and released to theatres on 10 January 2020.

Reception 
The film received critical acclaim.
In Anandabazar Patrika, Urmimala Basu called this film "a must watch movie" and praised its direction, screenplay, ensemble cast, music and cinematography. In The Times of India, Debolina Sen called this film "a rare gem" and praised its direction, screenplay and ensemble cast. In Film Companion, Sankhayan Ghosh called this film "surprisingly political" and praised its screenplay.

Awards 
 WBFJA Award for Best Film 
 WBFJA Award for Best Director- Anik Dutta
 WBFJA Award for Best Supporting Actor- Paran Bandyopadhyay
 WBFJA Award for Best Editor- Arghyakamal Mitra
 Filmfare Awards Bangla 2021 for Best Director - Anik Dutta
 Filmfare Awards Bangla 2021 for Best Film
 Filmfare Awards Bangla 2021 for Best Dialogue - Anik Dutta and Utsav Mukherjee

References

External links
 

2019 films
Bengali-language Indian films
Films directed by Anik Dutta
2010s Bengali-language films
Films based on works by Ramapada Chowdhury